Vicente Catada (born 11 October 1903, date of death unknown) was an Argentine boxer who competed in the 1924 Summer Olympics. In 1924 he was eliminated in the first round of the flyweight class after losing his fight to the upcoming bronze medalist Raymond Fee.

References

External links
profile

1903 births
Year of death missing
Flyweight boxers
Olympic boxers of Argentina
Boxers at the 1924 Summer Olympics
Argentine male boxers